Soreng is a town and headquarters of the Soreng district in the Indian state of Sikkim.  Soreng is a newly formed District.                        
Soreng is known for its largest production of vegetables, oranges and flowers. The inhabitants are mostly dependent on agriculture, floriculture and tourism for their livelihood and are mostly Sikkimese, Nepali. The majority of the community follow Hinduism and Buddhism while the rest are Christians.

The region is an Ecotourism spot, and thousands of people visit every year. It is close to Daramdin.

The area's major attractions are its landscapes, fisheries, views of Mount Kangchenjunga, flora and fauna, and white river rafting on the Teesta river.

Currently the M.L.A of Soreng is Aditya Golay Tamang (Sikkim Krantikari Morcha).

References

Cities and towns in Gyalshing district
Ecotourism